The Coriosolites or Curiosolitae were a Gallic people dwelling on the northern coast of present-day Brittany during the Iron Age and the Roman period.

Name 
They are mentioned as Coriosolitas (var. coriosolitos, curiosolitas, curiosolitas) and Coriosolites (var. coriosultes, coricoriosuelites, cariosu-) by Caesar (mid-1st c. BC), and as Coriosvelites  by Pliny (1st c. AD).

The etymology of the ethnonym Coriosolites remains uncertain. The first element is certainly the Gaulish root corio- ('army, troop'), derived from Proto-Indo-European *kóryos ('army, people under arms'). However, the meaning of the second element is unclear. Pierre-Yves Lambert has proposed to interpret corio-solit-es as 'those who purchase (or sell) mercenaries', by positing a Gaulish stem solitu- ('purchase/salary of mercenaries'; cf. Gaul. soldurio- <  'body-guard, loyal, devoted', OBret. solt 'solidus'). Alternatively, a connection with the Gaulish stem sūli- ('[good] sight'; cf. OIr. súil, 'sight', Britt. Sulis) has also been conjectured, with corio-soli-tes as the 'troop-watchers', 'those who watch over the troop'.

The city of Corseul, attested ca. 400 AD as civitas Coriosolitum ('civitas of the Curiosolites', Aecclesia Corsult ca. 869, Corsout in 1288) is named after the Gallic tribe.

Geography

Territory 

The Coriosolites are mentioned by Caesar together with the Veneti, Unelli, Osismi, and others that Caesar calls maritimae civitates, "maritime cities" which border on the Atlantic Ocean. In another place he describes the position of the Coriosolites on the ocean in the same terms, and includes them among the Armoric states, a name equivalent to maritimae. Pliny mentions them with the Unelli, Diablindi, and Rhedones.

Settlements 
The ancient settlement of Corseul was most likely established ex nihilo by the Roman authorities during the reign of Augustus, as the capital of the civitas Coriosolitum. The town is generally identified with the settlement of Fanum Martis ('temple of Mars') mentioned on the Tabula Peutingeriana (5th c. AD). Due to the lack of early epigraphic record, however, the original Gaulish name of the town remains unknown. Corseul reached at size of 47ha in the first centuries of the Common Era.

Around 340 AD, the capital of the civitas was moved to Aleth (Saint-Servan), situated on the coast.

Notes

Bibliography 

 

 

Historical Celtic peoples
Gauls
Tribes of pre-Roman Gaul
Curiosolitae
History of Brittany